Muhammad Ben Ali ar-Ribati (1861–1939) was one of the earliest Moroccan painters. As his surname suggests, Ribati was born in Rabat in 1861. However, he was based in Tangier, where he had access to materials for watercolors. Though he had no formal training, he was supported by European artists.

In 1903, Ribati became a cook for the Irish painter Sir John Lavery, who first settled in Morocco in 1890. Lavery noticed that Ribati was a gifted watercolor painter.

Exhibitions 
Ribati's first exhibition was at the Goupil Gallery in London in 1916. His second exhibition was in Marseille, France, in 1919, and his third was at the Mamounia hotel in Marrakesh in 1922.

Style 
Ribati preferred watercolor on paper as a medium over oil on canvas. He frequently painted Tangier, its qasba, and its inhabitants. He painted simplified human figures, and often painted a large, colorful scene with several people. He always signed his paintings in Arabic.

References 

1861 births
1939 deaths
19th-century Moroccan people
20th-century Moroccan painters
Moroccan male painters
People from Rabat